Micheaux Robinson (born April 3, 1983) is an arena football defensive back who is currently a free agent. He attended training camp with the Montreal Alouettes of the Canadian Football League. He played college football at Otterbein College.

In 2005 and 2006, Robinson played for the Wyoming Cavalry of the National Indoor Football League (NIFL).

He was signed as a free agent by the Jacksonville Sharks in 2009.

On September 7, 2011, he was signed by the Montreal Alouettes.

On May 11, 2012, Robinson was traded back the Jacksonville Sharks for Defensive Lineman T. J. Langley.

On May 30, 2012, Robinson returned to the Alouettes and was released on June 10, 2012.

On December 11, 2015, Robinson was assigned to the Sharks for the 2015 season.

He signed with the Atlanta Havoc in December 2017.

He was signed by the West Virginia  Roughriders December 17, 2019

On October 20, 2020, Robinson signed with the Carolina Cobras of the National Arena League (NAL). On March 15, 2022, Robinson re-signed with the Cobras.

References

External links
 Jacksonville Sharks Bio

1983 births
Living people
American football defensive backs
Wyoming Cavalry players
Orlando Predators players
Wilkes-Barre/Scranton Pioneers players
Jacksonville Sharks players
People from Fostoria, Ohio
Philadelphia Soul players
Montreal Alouettes players
American Arena League players
Otterbein Cardinals football players
Players of American football from Ohio